George Bryan (1770–1843) was an Irish politician in the United Kingdom House of Commons.

He was elected as a Member of Parliament for the County Kilkenny constituency in 1837, and held the seat until 1843.

References

External links 

    
    
    

1843 deaths
Members of the Parliament of the United Kingdom for County Kilkenny constituencies (1801–1922)
UK MPs 1837–1841
UK MPs 1841–1847
Irish Repeal Association MPs
1770 births